Tamara Šoletić (born 21 October 1965) is a Croatian actress.

Early life
Tamara graduated from the University of Zadar, Department of Education at the Faculty of Arts. Then, she got a job as a music teacher in elementary school and was employed as an actress and puppet maker since 1989, in the Zadar Puppet Theater. In addition to regular jobs, she worked as head of the reciter on the promotion of books. For many years she sang in a Dalmatian female klapa "Viola" and worked as a manager and an associate at Omiš klapa festival. She has worked with NK Zadar, in "It was the fifth, was the ninth."

Personal life
Tamara is the mother of two children.

Filmography

References

1965 births
Croatian actresses
Actors from Zadar
Living people